Fosbergia is a genus of flowering plants in the family Rubiaceae. The genus is found in southern China, Thailand, and Vietnam.

Species
Fosbergia alleizettii 
Fosbergia petelotii 
Fosbergia shweliensis 
Fosbergia thailandica

References

Rubiaceae genera
Gardenieae